Miss America 1972, the 45th Miss America pageant, was held at the Boardwalk Hall in Atlantic City, New Jersey, on September 11, 1971, and broadcast on NBC.

Laurie Lea Schaefer, representing Ohio, was crowned Miss America 1972. She became an actress, featured on TV series such as Falcon Crest, and later a casting director and talent scout.

Results

Placements

Order of announcements

Top 10

Top 5

Awards

Preliminary

Non-finalist awards

Other

Judges
Norton Mockridge
Maria Gambaraelli
Dr. W. Hugh Moomaw
Robert F. Lewine
Vivenne Della Chiesa
Edward Lobe
Hal David
Dr. Zelma George
Art Fleming

Contestants

References

External links
 Miss America official website

1972
1971 in the United States
1972 beauty pageants
1971 in New Jersey
September 1971 events in the United States
Events in Atlantic City, New Jersey